Archduke Maximilian Joseph of Austria-Este (July 14, 1782 – June 1, 1863), the fourth son of Archduke Ferdinand of Austria-Este and younger brother of Francis IV, Duke of Modena.  He was grand master of the Teutonic Knights from 1835 to 1863.

Biography
Born in Milan, Maximilian was the son of Archduke Ferdinand of Austria (son of Maria Theresa of Austria and governor of Italy) and Maria Beatrice Ricciarda d'Este. He spent his youth in Monza, where his family had fled after the French invasion of the Duchy of Modena. After staying in Verona, Padua, Trieste and Ljubljana, his family moved to Wiener Neustadt.

In 1801 he joined the Teutonic Order, obtaining the Austrian Cross in 1804. After studying in the Collegium Teresianum of Wiener Neustadt, he was named Major General in the Austrian Army (1805). In 1809 he fought in Germany against the French; he clashed with the Napoleonic troops at Regensburg, leading his army towards Linz. In 1819 he was elected a Royal Fellow of the Royal Society.

In 1830 Maximilian established himself in the Ebenzweier Castle, near Altmünster am Traunsee, while from 1831 to 1839 he lived in Linz. In 1835 he was named Grand Master of the Teutonic Order.

Maximilian  erected several fortifications in the Austrian possessions in Italy, such as the Torri Massimiliane of Verona and the Torre Massimiliana of Venice.

He died in 1863 in the Ebenzweier castle. He is buried in Altmünster.

Ancestry

References

External links
 

1782 births
1863 deaths
People from Monza
Grand Masters of the Teutonic Order
Austria-Este
Modenese princes
Austrian princes
Austrian Empire commanders of the Napoleonic Wars
Generals of the Holy Roman Empire
Sons of monarchs